James Henry Porteous Oakes (1821–1901) was a British Conservative politician.

James was the son of Henry Oakes and Maria Ann Porteus.

Oakes was elected Conservative MP for Bury St Edmunds at a by-election in 1852—caused by the appointment of John Stuart as a Vice-Chancellor in the Court of Chancery—and held the seat until 1857 when he was defeated.

References

External links
 

UK MPs 1852–1857
1821 births
1901 deaths
Conservative Party (UK) MPs for English constituencies
Politicians from Bury St Edmunds